As'ad ( /), informally transcribed as Asaad or Assaad, is an Arabic male given name derived from the elative degree of the adjective  , thus meaning "more/most fortunate, happier/happiest, luckier/luckiest". It also exists as a surname.

People with the given name
As'ad ibn Zurara, companion of Muhammad
As'ad Pasha al-Azm
As'ad Syamsul Arifin
As'ad Shukeiri
As'ad Adib Bayudh
As'ad AbuKhalil
Asaad Kelada
Assaad Bouab
Assaad W. Razzouk
Assaad Taha
Assaad Seif
Assaad Feddah
Assaad Chaftari
Assaad Andraos
Assaad Hardan

People with the surname
Ahmad El-Assaad
Kamel Asaad
Khaled al-Asaad, prominent Syrian archaeologist and historian killed by ISIS
Man Asaad
Nizar Assaad

References

Arabic masculine given names
Arabic-language surnames